Alan Tutton (born 23 February 1973) is a former professional footballer who played in The Football League for Maidstone United.

References

English footballers
Maidstone United F.C. (1897) players
English Football League players
1973 births
Living people
Alma Swanley F.C. players
Dartford F.C. players
Association football forwards